Sevaiattam or Servaiattam is a traditional dance performed by villagers in Tamil Nadu, in the southern part of India.

References

Tamil dance styles

ta:தமிழர் ஆடற்கலை